The 2004–05 Mid-American Conference men's basketball season began with practices in October 2004, followed by the start of the 2004–05 NCAA Division I men's basketball season in November. Conference play began in January 2005 and concluded in March 2005. Miami won the regular season title with a conference record of 12–6 by one game over a five-way tie for second place. Fourth-seeded Ohio beat Miami in the semi-finals and defeated second-seeded Buffalo in overtime in the final. Leon Williams of Ohio was named the tournament MVP. Ohio represented the MAC in the NCAA tournament. There they lost in the first round to Florida.

Preseason awards
The preseason poll was announced by the league office on October 21, 2004.

Preseason men's basketball poll
Buffalo was picked by the media to win the East. Toledo was picked to win the West.

Honors

Postseason

Mid–American tournament

NCAA tournament

Postseason awards

Coach of the Year: Charlie Coles, Miami
Player of the Year: Turner Battle, Buffalo
Freshman of the Year: Leon Williams, Ohio
Defensive Player of the Year:  Chet Mason, Miami
Sixth Man of the Year: Mark Bortz, Buffalo

Honors

See also
2004–05 Mid-American Conference women's basketball season

References